Daas/Daat Elyon ("Higher Knowledge") and Daas/Daat Tachton ("Lower Knowledge") are two alternative levels of perception of reality in Hasidic thought. Their terms derive from the Kabbalistic sephirot: Keter (above conscious Will) and Da'at (conscious Knowledge), considered two levels of the same unifying principle; the first encompassing, the second internalised within the person. In Kabbalah either Keter or Da'at are listed in the 10 sephirot, but not both. While the significance of this duality is limited in Kabbalah to its discussion of the Heavenly realms, the significance, and the terminology of "Higher" and "Lower Knowledge" emerges in the Hasidic internalisation of Kabbalah to describe alternative, paradoxical conscious perceptions of Divine Panentheism in this material World. Upper Knowledge refers to the Divine view "from Above", Lower Knowledge to the Created view "from Below".

Description
The terms Daas Elyon and Tachton are used particularly in the Habad philosophical systemisation of Hasidic thought. The alternative Kabbalistic terms Ayin and Yesh ("Non-Being and Being") are more commonly used in wider Hasidic mysticism. Habad differed from Mainstream Hasidism by its intellectual investigation of the Kabbalistic terminology and concepts that Hasidism had adapted to its psychologically focused mysticism. In this Daas Elyon and Tachton take on a related, but wider conceptual connotation than Ayin and Yesh, as they become the two alternative conscious perception paradigms of all Hasidic mysticism. Hasidism had extended the significance of Ayin and Yesh beyond its Heavenly abstract Kabbalistic meaning, to describe how this physical realm is alternatively Being or Non-Being, as perceived by Creation, in its nullification in the Panentheistic Divine All. Higher and Lower Knowledge broadens this further to any spiritual level of existence, or any concept under consideration.

In historical Kabbalah, Keter ("Crown") is the transcendent Divine Will above conscious internalisation, while Da'at ("Knowledge") is the internalised aspect of the same principle, channeling the Creative Ohr lifeforce into existence. Consequently, Keter is the "Hidden Knowledge", that becomes revealed in Da'at. Moshe Cordovero lists Keter as the first sephirah and excludes Da'at, while Isaac Luria excludes Keter as being too transcendent to consider as the first cause of Creation, while substituting Da'at instead. Where Keter is the hidden soul root of the intellectual sephirot, Da'at is the hidden soul root of the emotions that emerge subsequently. Keter is revealed in Intellect, and Da'at is revealed in Emotions.

Hasidic thought adapted Kabbalistic terminology to its own concern with direct psychological perception in deveikut cleaving to God. It related the sephirot to their corresponding parallels in the Kochos hanefesh (soul powers) devotional experience in Man. Similarly Da'at Elyon and Tachton emerge as the two alternative perspectives of Creation, the Divine consciousness "from Above", and the Created consciousness "from Below". While Hasidic thought universally retains the Kabbalistic meaning of Ayin (Non-Being) to refer to the inaccessible grasp of the Infinite Divine from the Creation's perspective, and Yesh (Being) to refer to Creation's perception of its own existence, this ascription only reflects the Lower Knowledge view. From the Divine view of Higher Knowledge, in truth only God exists, who is the Yesh Amity ("True Being"). Creation is nullified into acosmic non-existence (Ayin) within its Divine source, "as the light of the sun is nullified within the sun's orb". Nonetheless, as Hasidic mysticism describes man's devotion to God, it still uses the terms Ayin and Yesh in their Lower Knowledge, traditional Kabbalistic reference, and not reversed.

Examples
 Yichudah Ilaah ("Higher Unity") and Yichudah Tataah ("Lower Unity"), the two levels of perceiving God's Monotheism. This alternative paradox is explained in the second section of the Tanya, reflecting the author's most metaphorical interpretation of the Lurianic Tzimtzum, tending to Acosmic Monism. See Divine Unity in Hasidism.
... It seems to the lower worlds as if the light and lifeforce of the Omnipresent, blessed be He...were something apart from His blessed Self ... Yet in regard to the Holy One, blessed be He, there is no tzimtzum, concealment and occultation that would conceal and hide before Him ... for the tzimtzumim and garments are not things distinct from His blessed Self, heaven forefend, but (Genesis Rabba 21:5) "like the snail whose garment is part of its very self"
 In Habad Hasidic explanation of Free will, the paradox of human choice versus Divine foreknowledge relates to two alternative levels within the Divine knowledge of Creation. In the lower perspective, after the Tzimtzum (apparent concealment of God), God knows events "as an observer". In the higher perspective before the tzimtzum, God knows Creation from its source within Himself.
 Higher and Lower Da'at relates to the Upper and Lower Chokhmah (Wisdom), the first of the three intellectual sephirot. The Zohar predicts, based on its interpretation of the upper and lower waters of Noah's flood (rains from above, wellsprings from below), that in the sixth century of the Hebrew sixth millennium (corresponding to the secular years 1740-1840) Wisdom will flood the World in preparation for the Messianic era. In the Likkutei Sichos talks of the Lubavitcher Rebbe, he relates this prediction to the Higher Wisdom of Hasidic thought (called the Baal Shem Tov's "Wellsprings") and the Lower Wisdom of secular Science and thought. In Kabbalah the two levels of Water/Wisdom correspond to the Higher and Lower Waters in the account of Creation in Genesis I.
 In Kabbalah's interpretation of the Tetragrammaton name of God, the first two letters are the "Concealed World" of Divine Intellect, corresponding to Atziluth and Beri'ah in the Four Worlds, and the last two letters are the "Revealed World" of Divine Emotions, corresponding to Yetzirah and Assiah. In the first section of Tanya, the Talmudic directive to bless God for misfortune as well as fortune is related to misfortune stemming from the higher hidden realms. In its source, the misfortune descends from a blessing too high to descend in revelation, as "no evil descends from above".
 The Tetragrammaton and Elokim Divine Names in Kabbalah correspond to infinite transcendent encompassing light and finite immanent filling light. In Genesis chapter 1 Creation takes place through Elokim, while in Genesis 2 through both names. In Hasidic interpretation the essential Tetragrammaton Divine Infinitude enacts creation Something from Nothing, but shines through the concealment of Elokim to allow Creation to seem independent from God. In this Elokim becomes the means for revelation, as a Creation directly through the Tetragrammaton would be nullified. This corresponds to two levels of  Bittul (Nullification): Bittul HaMetzius ("Nullification of Essence") and Bittul HaYesh ("Nullification of Ego"). As the highest of the Four Worlds Atziluth is still emanation, before perceived Creation, relatively it reflects Essential Nullification. In comparison to the lower two Worlds, also Beri'ah has some relation to Higher Bittul through the enclothement of Wisdom (Atziluth) descending into Understanding (Beriah). Prophecy is explained in Kabbalah to be the letters of Creation in Atziluth, as they descend into Beriah. This means Divine transcendent insight descending into some understanding. Similarly, Beriah is described in Kabbalah as the realm of the Divine "Throne", as the full emanated Divinity of Atziluth cloths itself through descent in Beriah, metaphorically as if descending onto a throne, to govern lower creation from above as a King.
 In historical Kabbalah, all levels of existence reflect and correspond to higher Divine parallels in their root. In Kabbalah, the Male principle is defined as the giver/emanator, while the Female principle is the receiver/nurturer. Hasidic thought emphasises the ultimate advantage of the lower Female receiving level as the ultimate purpose of Creation. In the sephirot the Male corresponds to the 6 Emotions centred on Tiferet (Balanced Harmony), reflecting the revelation of Upper Knowledge, while the Female corresponds to Malkuth (Fulfilment in Action), the indwelling Shechinah (Divine Presence) in creation. In turn these principles reflect and are ultimately rooted in the Kav first emanation line into the Vacuum created by the Tzimtzum, and the unfolding sephirot in the scheme of circles. The Male corresponds to Yashar (Line) and the Female to Igul (Circle), reflected in the anatomy of Man and Woman. In general the Male relates to Higher Knowledge and Soul, and the Female to Lower Knowledge and Body. In the Messianic Era, the Female will emerge from its historical subordinate status, as the body will give life to the soul, through Atzmus (Divine essence) being revealed in the Physical. The contemporary emancipation of Women gives a foretaste of this. This is alluded to by the Midrash on Genesis 1 of the Moon's diminished light and future reinstatement with the Sun.

See also
Sephirot
Ayin and Yesh
Divine providence in Hasidism
Atzmus

Notes

Hasidic thought
Kabbalistic words and phrases
Sephirot